Agila (Spanish dialect Castúo for "Liven up") is the sixth studio album by Spanish hard rock band Extremoduro. Recorded in 1995, produced by Iñaki "Uoho" Antón and released on 23 February 1996.

Agila is often considered to be their breakthrough album. Published in 1996, a year after its preceding album, Pedrá, it featured instruments that had not appeared before on any of Extremoduro's albums. It includes some of the most famous songs by the band: "So payaso", "Buscando una luna", "Prometeo", "Sucede" and "El día de la bestia", which was included on the  movie of the same name soundtrack.

Track listing

2011 edition bonus tracks

Personnel 
Extremoduro
 Roberto "Robe" Iniesta – vocals; acoustic and electric guitars; keyboards on #10
 Iñaki "Milindris" Setién – guitars except on #04, 09, 12, 13
 Ramón "Mon" Sogas – bass except on #04, 07, 09, 13
 Alberto "Capi" Gil – drums except on #04, 05, 09, 13
Additional personnel
 Iñaki "Uoho" Antón – guitars except on 06, 07, 09, 10, 13; bass on #04, 07, 09; keyboards on #01, 05, 10; piano on #04; hammond organ on #11; percussion on #02, 03, 08, 11, 14
 Fito Cabrales – Spanish guitar on #06; 13; cajón on #13
 Albert Pla – vocals on #07
 José Sañudo – saxophone on #01, 02, 03, 06, 08, 10, 14; flute on #13
 Sergio (Ratanera) – drums on #04, 09
 Pepegu (Ratanera) – bass on #04, 09
 Isaac (Ratanera) – guitars on #04, 09
 Sime – trombone on #04
 "Reverendo" – hammond organ on #06
 Josu Monje – programming on #05; drums on #05
 Elena – chorus on #05

Charts and certifications

Chart performance

Certifications

Reception 

Rolling Stone magazine referred to it as a masterpiece of the Spanish rock. 
In 2007 it was ranked by American magazine Al Borde as the 227th best Ibero-American album of all time, being a relative low position because at the time of the album's release the band was still unknown to Latin America.
In 2012 was ranked as the 12th best album of the Spanish rock according to Rolling Stone.

The track "So payaso" was ranked as the 103rd best song of the rock en español ever by the magazine Al borde, in addition to winning the award for best music video of the Spanish Music Awards in 1997. Likewise, it was included as DLC in the video game Guitar Hero III: Legends of Rock.

References

External links 
  

1996 albums
Extremoduro albums
Spanish-language albums